Brickellia vollmeri is a Mexican species of flowering plants in the family Asteraceae. It is native to northwestern Mexico in the state of Baja California.

References

vollmeri
Flora of Baja California
Plants described in 1943